The Sandpit Generals (also released as The Defiant and The Wild Pack) is a 1971 drama film directed by Hall Bartlett. Its plot is based on the novel Captains of the Sands by Jorge Amado. Melodious soundtracks were written by Dorival Caymmi.

The film was not popular in the United States due to its socialist context and was banned by Brazil's military regime for the same reason, but became an iconic film in the Soviet Union, where it took part in the 7th Moscow International Film Festival and, although did not win any prize, in a few years was widely distributed in movie theaters and was proclaimed "the best foreign film" by Komsomolskaya Pravda newspaper in 1974.

In the socialist country, the movie became so well-known that it inspired theater plays, books, special reports on post-Soviet criminal youth etc.

Plot
The film features a street gang of poor homeless youth struggling for existence in Brazil. After letting a girl with her little brother settle in their beach shelter, the gang's inner spirit is gradually reformed as she brings a sense of love and family into their shabby abode. One of the local priests helps the gang at the cost of his clergy career. Police eventually capture the main characters and after their lengthy stay in prison, the girl is terminally ill. Her sudden death is a culmination of the movie, it urges the gang to fight for their rights against the government.

Cast
 Juarez Santalvo
 Freddie Gedeon as Almiro
 Ademir da Silva as Big John
 Guilherme Lamounier as The Cat
 Eliana Pittman as Dalvah
 Dorival Caymmi as John Adam
 Peter Nielsen as Lollipop
 Mark De Vries as Dry Turn
 Butch Patrick as No Legs
 John Rubinstein as Professor
 Tisha Sterling as Dora
 Kent Lane as Bullet

See also
 List of American films of 1971
 List of hood films

References

External links

English version of Russian lyrics of the song http://www.stihi.ru/2012/02/06/510

1971 films
1971 drama films
American drama films
Street children
Films based on Brazilian novels
Films set in Brazil
Films directed by Hall Bartlett
Childhood in Brazil
Films based on works by Jorge Amado
Films shot in Brazil
1970s English-language films
1970s American films